Spermolepis inermis, the Red River scaleseed or spreading scaleseed, is a species of flowering plant in the family Apiaceae. It is native to the central and southeastern United States, and eastern Mexico. An annual reaching , it is found in grasslands.

References

Apioideae
Flora of Nebraska
Flora of Kansas
Flora of Oklahoma
Flora of Minnesota
Flora of Iowa
Flora of Missouri
Flora of Indiana
Flora of the South-Central United States
Flora of the Southeastern United States
Flora of Northeastern Mexico
Flora of Veracruz
Plants described in 1941